Savuti Airport  is an airport serving the Chobe National Park in the North-West District of Botswana.

See also

Transport in Botswana
List of airports in Botswana

References

External links
OpenStreetMap - Savuti
OurAirports - Savuti
SkyVector - Savuti

Airports in Botswana